William Thomas Barnett (29 December 1876–unknown) was an English footballer who played in the Football League for Nottingham Forest.

References

1876 births
English footballers
Association football forwards
English Football League players
Nottingham Forest F.C. players
Newark Town F.C. players
Year of death missing